Yemsa is the language of the Yem people of the former Kingdom of Yamma, known as Kingdom of Janjero to the Amhara. It is a member of the Omotic group of languages, most closely related to Kafa. It is distinctive in having different systems of vocabulary depending on social status, rather like Japanese and Javanese. The estimated number of speakers varies wildly from about 1000 (Bender, 1976) to half a million (Aklilu, 1993).

Yemsa is the main language spoken in Yem special woreda, SNNPR.

The Fuga dialect is distinct enough to perhaps be a different language.

Sample verb forms

  - I do
  - we do
  - you (singular) do
  - he does
  - she does

Notes

External links 
 World Atlas of Language Structures information on Yemsa
Yemsa basic lexicon at the Global Lexicostatistical Database

North Omotic languages
Languages of Ethiopia